Lee Sang-hun (born 30 September 1938) is a South Korean long-distance runner. He competed in the marathon at the 1964 Summer Olympics and the 1968 Summer Olympics.

References

External links
 

1938 births
Living people
Athletes (track and field) at the 1964 Summer Olympics
Athletes (track and field) at the 1968 Summer Olympics
South Korean male long-distance runners
South Korean male marathon runners
Olympic athletes of South Korea
Asian Games medalists in athletics (track and field)
Asian Games bronze medalists for South Korea
Athletes (track and field) at the 1966 Asian Games
Medalists at the 1966 Asian Games
Sportspeople from North Chungcheong Province
20th-century South Korean people